The 1936 Daily Mail Gold Cup was a professional snooker tournament sponsored by the Daily Mail. Despite giving a handicap to all the other players, the cup was won by Joe Davis who won all his five matches. The Australian Horace Lindrum finished in second place in the final table. It was the third Daily Mail Gold Cup tournament, although the first two had been billiards events. The Daily Mail Gold Cup ran from 1935 to 1940.

Format
The third event was a round-robin snooker tournament and was played from 28 September to 19 December 1936. Most of the matches were played at Thurston's Hall in London. There were 6 competitors and a total of 15 matches. Each match was of 71 frames, lasting six days (Monday to Saturday) and consisted of two sessions of six frames each day (five on the final evening). The 6 competitors were Joe Davis, Horace Lindrum, Sidney Smith, Willie Smith, Tom Newman and Melbourne Inman. The event had two handicapping aspects. Each player had a handicap which was given in each frame. The handicaps were: Joe Davis - 0, Horace Lindrum - 7, Sidney Smith - 14, Willie Smith - 18, Tom Newman - 24, Melbourne Inman - 35. In addition there was a sealed handicap for each match. This was an additional adjustment to be made after each match (a number of frames) which was kept secret until the end of the tournament. It seems that the handicapper decided to make no adjustments since the final table simply reflects the actual results.

Results
The cup was won by Joe Davis who won all his five matches. Melbourne Inman, an aging billiards player, struggled, despite receiving the most generous handicap. The other four players were very close in the final table. Willie Smith won a prize for the most frames won in a match, 48 in his match against Melbourne Inman.

During the tournament Sidney Smith scored a record 133 break, becoming the first player to make a total clearance in snooker competition. It happened in his match against Tom Newman on 11 December. Smith was conceding 10 points to Newman in this match and went further behind when he went in-off a red. Smith then made the total clearance which included the 15 reds with six blacks, six pinks, two blues, a green and then all the colours. The clearance was in frame 58 of the match, the fourth of the evening session. Smith won the prize for the highest break of the tournament.

Table

The positions were determined firstly by the number of matches won (MW) and, in the event of a tie, the number of frames won (FW).

References

1936
1936 in snooker
1936 in English sport
1936 sports events in London